is a train station of West Japan Railway Company(JR West) in Okuizumo, Nita, Shimane, Japan on Kisuki Line. Its nickname is Kushinadahime.

Just four trains from Shinji Station including seasonal Okuizumo-Orochi-Gō(奥出雲おろち号) run through to Bingo Ochiai Station. Other trains end their journey at this station.

Structure 
Two side platforms on ground. The wooden station building which imitated the Shinto shrine was built in 1934 when the station opened.

Surrounding area 
There is a town square. There is reserved a semaphore signal in front of the station.
National Highway Route 314

Adjacent stations

See also 
 List of railway stations in Japan

External links 
 Izumo Yokota Station (JR West)

Railway stations in Japan opened in 1934
Railway stations in Shimane Prefecture